Village View is a 1,236-unit apartment complex located in the East Village neighborhood of the borough of Manhattan in New York City. Created as a Mitchell-Lama Co-op, it opened in 1964, and consists of seven buildings located between First Avenue and Avenue A, from East 2nd to East 6th Streets. Three of the buildings have 21 floors, while the other four buildings have 16 floors. The development was built by the New York City Housing Authority (NYCHA) and sponsored by six local educational institutions including New York University, Bank Street College of Education, City College, Cooper Union, Mills College of Education and the New School for Social Research.

References

Residential buildings in Manhattan
East Village, Manhattan